Table with Pink Tablecloth is an artwork by American artist Richard Artschwager, now in the collection of the Art Institute of Chicago. 

It is a work in three-dimensions constructed of Formica on wood. It was made in 1964 using skills Artschwager gained designing furniture using similar materials and similar techniques. The sculpture measures 64.8 x 111.8 x 111.8 cm (25 1/2 x 44 x 44 in). 

According to art critic Ken Johnson Table With Pink Tablecloth is "something of a cross between Pop Art and a Minimalist cube by Donald Judd".

Artschwager is quoted as saying "It’s not sculptural. It’s more like a painting pushed into three dimensions. It’s a picture of wood."

At the 2009 Venice Biennale, sculptor Rachel Harrison recreated Table with Pink Tablecloth in tribute.

References

External links
 Brookly Rail, February 2008
 Saatchi Gallery

1964 sculptures
Wooden sculptures in Illinois
Sculptures of the Art Institute of Chicago